Culey may refer to:

People
 Marcus Culey (born 1993), Australian cyclist
 Culey, namesake of Ratcliffe Culey in Leicestershire, England

Places
 Culey, Meuse, France
 Culey-le-Patry, France
 Loisey-Culey, France

See also

Curley (disambiguation)
 Culley (disambiguation)